Haldibari may refer to:

Haldibari (community development block), West Bengal, India
Haldibari, India, a city in West Bengal, India
Haldibari, Nepal, a village development committee